Australoactina is a genus of flies in the family Stratiomyidae.

Species
Australoactina brevihirta (Hardy, 1932)
Australoactina brisbanensis (Hardy, 1939)
Australoactina costata (White, 1914)
Australoactina imperfecta (Hardy, 1932)
Australoactina incisuralis (Macquart, 1847)
Australoactina nigricornis (Enderlein, 1921)
Australoactina ocinis (Hardy, 1932)
Australoactina silvicola (Hardy, 1932)

References

Stratiomyidae
Brachycera genera
Diptera of Australasia